In mathematics, the Rudin–Shapiro sequence, also known as the Golay–Rudin–Shapiro sequence, is an infinite 2-automatic sequence named after Marcel Golay, Walter Rudin, and Harold S. Shapiro, who independently investigated its properties.

Definition

then let

The Rudin–Shapiro sequence  is then defined by

Thus  if  is even and  if  is odd.

0, 0, 0, 1, 0, 0, 1, 2, 0, 0, 0, 1, 1, 1, 2, 3, ... 

and the corresponding terms  of the Rudin–Shapiro sequence are:

+1, +1, +1, −1, +1, +1, −1, +1, +1, +1, +1, −1, −1, −1, +1, −1, ... 

For example,  and  because the binary representation of 6 is 110, which contains one occurrence of 11; whereas  and  because the binary representation of 7 is 111, which contains two (overlapping) occurrences of 11.

Historical motivation

The Rudin–Shapiro sequence was introduced independently by Golay, Rudin, and Shapiro. The following is a description of Rudin's motivation. In Fourier analysis, one is often concerned with the  norm of a measurable function . This norm is defined by

However, the Rudin–Shapiro sequence  satisfies a tighter bound: there exists a constant  such that

It is conjectured that one can take , but while it is known that , the best published upper bound is currently . Let  be the n-th Shapiro polynomial. More recently, bounds have also been given for the magnitude of the coefficients of  where .

Shapiro arrived at the sequence because the polynomials 

This is discussed in more detail in the article on Shapiro polynomials. Golay's motivation was similar, although he was concerned with applications to spectroscopy and published in an optics journal.

Properties
The Rudin–Shapiro sequence can be generated by a 4-state automaton accepting binary representations of non-negative integers as input. The sequence is therefore 2-automatic, so by Cobham's little theorem there exists a 2-uniform morphism  with fixed point  and a coding  such that , where  is the Rudin–Shapiro sequence. However, the Rudin–Shapiro sequence cannot be expressed as the fixed point of some uniform morphism alone.

There is a recursive definition

The values of the terms an and bn in the Rudin–Shapiro sequence can be found recursively as follows. If n = m·2k where m is odd then

Thus a108 = a13 + 1 = a3 + 1 = a1 + 2 = a0 + 2 = 2, which can be verified by observing that the binary representation of 108, which is 1101100, contains two sub-strings 11. And so b108 = (−1)2 = +1.

A 2-uniform morphism  that requires a coding   to generate the Rudin-Shapiro sequence is the following:    

The Rudin–Shapiro word +1 +1 +1 −1 +1 +1 −1 +1 +1 +1 +1 −1 −1 −1 +1 −1 ..., which is created by concatenating the terms of the Rudin–Shapiro sequence, is a fixed point of the morphism or string substitution rules

+1 +1  →  +1 +1 +1 −1
+1 −1  →  +1 +1 −1 +1
−1 +1  →  −1 −1 +1 −1
−1 −1  →  −1 −1 −1 +1

as follows:

+1 +1 → +1 +1 +1 −1 → +1 +1 +1 −1 +1 +1 −1 +1 → +1 +1 +1 −1 +1 +1 −1 +1 +1 +1 +1 −1 −1 −1 +1 −1 ...

It can be seen from the morphism rules that the Rudin–Shapiro string contains at most four consecutive +1s and at most four consecutive −1s.

The sequence of partial sums of the Rudin–Shapiro sequence, defined by

with values

1, 2, 3, 2, 3, 4, 3, 4, 5, 6, 7, 6, 5, 4, 5, 4, ... 

can be shown to satisfy the inequality

satisfies

The Rudin–Shapiro sequence along squares  is normal.

The complete Rudin–Shapiro sequence satisfies the following uniform distribution result. If , then there exists  such that

which implies that  is uniformly distributed modulo  for all irrationals .

Relationship with one-dimensional Ising model

Let the binary expansion of n be given by

where . Recall that the complete Rudin–Shapiro sequence is defined by

Let

Then let

Finally, let

Recall that the partition function of the one-dimensional Ising model can be defined as follows. Fix  representing the number of sites, and fix constants  and  representing the coupling constant and external field strength, respectively. Choose a sequence of weights  with each . For any sequence of spins  with each , define its Hamiltonian by

Let  be a constant representing the temperature, which is allowed to be an arbitrary non-zero complex number, and set  where  is Boltzmann's constant. The partition function is defined by

Then we have

where the weight sequence  satisfies  for all .

See also
Shapiro polynomials

Notes

References
 
 
 
 

Binary sequences